Loredana "Lory" Del Santo (born 28 September 1958) is an Italian television personality and actress, now retired.

Early life 

Lory Del Santo was born Loredana Del Santo on 28 September 1958, in Povegliano Veronese, a comune in the Italian region Veneto.

Biography

Del Santo began her exposure to entertainment at sixteen when she served as a valletta (assistant) in the 1975 edition of Festivalbar, which took place for the first time, that year, at the Verona Arena. (As of this date, that arena continues as the permanent venue for the final evening of the music festival, and for the most important live concerts.) After graduating from high school, she left Verona for Rome and Milan alone (without her mother's consent), to attempt a career in film and fashion.

In that period, Del Santo worked as a model, fashion photographer, and entrepreneur, and studied acting. She had her first film role, and then by the late 1970s had taken part in 20 films over six years—directed, among others, by Dino Risi, Adriano Celentano, and Massimo Troisi. Some of these films were in the Commedia sexy all'italiana genre. In 1980, Del Santo was the contestant and representative from the nation of Italy, at the Miss Universe competition.

In the early-1980s Del Santo became popular thanks to her participation in successful TV shows such as Renzo Arbore's Tagli, ritagli e frattaglie (1981) and Antonio Ricci's Drive In (1983-1988).  In the second half of the 1980s, she set aside her career in the entertainment industry to devote herself to her private life.

In 1989 and 1990 she went on tour as the protagonist for a theatrical show alongside Walter Chiari. In the Autumn of 1991 she was requested for another theatre tour, but gave up for personal reasons.

Del Santo was a focus of gossip columns in UK mainly for her relationship with Eric Clapton (who dedicated the song "Lady of Verona" to her) and for the death of their son, Conor Loren. While he was still married to Pattie Boyd, Clapton embarked on a relationship with the twenty-seven year old Del Santo and fathered Conor, who was born on 21 August 1986. Conor died on 20 March 1991, at the age of four and a half, when he fell out of an open window on the 53rd floor of a Manhattan apartment building, the Galleria. The window, which was about 4 ft by 6 ft tall, had been opened by a building cleaner. The tragedy took place in the middle of an about 20-day stay in New York by Lory and Conor, who was looked after also by a babysitter. The death of their son was the inspiration for Clapton's songs, "Tears in Heaven", "Circus" and "My Father's Eyes".
 
After a long absence, she returned to television in 2005, participating in the third season of L'isola dei famosi. During this show, she received such high approval from the public that it aroused the interest of even the hardest detractors of this television genre; in the last episode she received 75% of the votes. In years following, she took part in others Italian reality shows, TV shows, and radio broadcasts.

In 2006 a publishing house asked her to write an autobiography, but she had stated that she doesn't appreciate biographies and autobiographies, so she found a compromise and wrote a particular book that she calls an "autobiography of my thoughts", with the title Piacere è una sfida; neither Eric Clapton nor their son are mentioned in it, being very personal matters. During her entire career, she has chosen never to be accompanied by an agent or other specific figures, preferring total self-determination.

The Italian singer Zucchero wrote in his autobiography about how Lory Del Santo had the idea to introduce him to Clapton, inviting the Italian singer for dinner with the couple. From this meeting, an artistic collaboration and a long friendship between the two musicians was born.

Personal life

In her book, Del Santo states that she had an affair with George Harrison in December 1991 in Hiroshima, shortly after the death of her (and Clapton's) son. She has two other children, Devin and Loren, whom she raised alone as a single mother. Since the first moments of notoriety in 1981, she has always declared herself against the bond of marriage, and she has never married.

Her son, Loren Del Santo, took his own life in 2018 at just 19 years old, after having long suffered from a psychiatric illness called anhedonia, a disease that prevents those affected from experiencing pleasure, feelings or emotions of any kind. For years he had lived in the United States, in Miami, where he studied at Miami Beach High School. Born in 1999, Loren was the youngest of her children.

Filmography

Films

Television

As a director

References

External links 
 

1958 births
20th-century Italian actresses
Italian beauty pageant winners
Italian female models
Italian film actresses
Living people
Miss Universe 1980 contestants
Participants in Italian reality television series
People from the Province of Verona